The Gunditjmara or Gunditjamara, also known as Dhauwurd Wurrung, are an Aboriginal Australian people of southwestern Victoria. They are the traditional owners of the areas now encompassing Warrnambool, Port Fairy, Woolsthorpe and Portland. Their land includes much of the Budj Bim heritage areas. The Kerrup Jmara (Kerrupjmara, Kerrup-Jmara) are a clan of the Gunditjmara, whose traditional lands are around Lake Condah. The Koroitgundidj (Koroit gundidj) are another clan group, whose lands are around Tower Hill.

The Djargurd Wurrung, Girai wurrung, and Gadubanud are also Aboriginal Victorian groups who all spoke languages in the dialect continuum known as the Dhauwurd Wurrung language ("Gunditjmara language").

Name
Gunditjmara is formed from two morphemes: Gunditj, a suffix denoting belonging to a particular group or locality, and the noun mara, meaning "man".

Language

The Dhauwurd wurrung language is a term used for a group of languages spoken by various groups of the Gunditjmara people. Different linguists have identified different groupings of lects and languages (see the main article for details), and the whole group is also sometimes referred to as the Gunditjmara language or the Warrnambool language. Some of the major languages or dialects often grouped under these names were:

Keerray Woorroong (Girai Wurrung, Kirrae wuurong, Kiriwurrung, etc.) is regarded by the Victorian Aboriginal Corporation for Languages as a separate language; it is of the Girai wurrung people.
Gadubanud (Katubanut), also Yarro waetch, was spoken by a group known as the Gadubanud, of the Cape Otway area; Barry Blake regards this as a dialect of the Warrnambool language, but Krishna-Pillay does not.
Djargurd Wurrong (Warn tallin, Warn thalayn,) was the language of the Djargurd Wurrong people.

Country
The Gunditjmara tribal territories extends over an estimated . The western boundaries are around Cape Bridgewater and Lake Condah. Northwards they reach Caramut and Hamilton. Their eastern boundaries lay around the Hopkins River. Their neighbours to the west are the Buandig people, to the north the Jardwadjali and Djab wurrung peoples, and in the east the Girai wurrung people. Early settlers remarked on the richness of the game to be found from the Eumerella Creek down to the coast.

Culture
The way of life of the Aboriginal people of Western Victoria differed from other Aboriginal Victorians in several respects. Because of the colder climate, they made, wore, and used as blankets, rugs of possum and kangaroo. Possum-skin cloaks, used by Gunditjmara and other peoples of the south-east, were made sewn with string, and worn for warmth, used to carry babies on their backs, as drums in ceremony and as a burial cloak. They are still made today as part of revitalisation of culture and as an instrument for healing.

They also built huts from wood and local basalt (known as bluestone), with roofs made of turf and branches. Stone tools were used for cutting, and are held in collections across Victoria today. The women used digging sticks, also known as yam sticks, for digging yams, goannas, ants and other foods out of the ground, as well as for defence, for settling disputes and for punishment purposes as part of customary law.

Dreaming

The Gunditjmara believe that the landscape's features mark out the traces of a creator, Budj Bim (meaning "High Head"), who emerged in the form of the volcano previously called Mount Eccles. In a spate of eruption, the lava flows, constituting his blood and teeth, spilled over the landscape, fashioning its wetlands. "High Head" still refers to the crater's brow, which can be accessed only by Gunditjmara men wearing special emu-feather footwear.
Opposite, beyond the coastline, the island they call Deen Maar/Dhinmar held special value for its burial associations. Rocks on the mainland shore facing the island contain a cave, known as Tarn wirrung ("road of the spirits"), which is thought of as the mouth of a passage linking the mainland and the island.

In Gunditjmara funeral rites, bodies are enfolded in grass bundles and interred with their heads pointing to the island, with an apotropaic firebrand of native cherry wood. If grass was thereafter found outside the mouth of Tarn wirrung, it was regarded as evidence that the good spirit Puit puit chepetch had conveyed the corpse via the subterranean passage to the island, while guiding its spirit to the realm of the clouds. If the burial coincided with the appearance of a meteor, this was read as proof that the being in transit to the heavens had been furnished with fire. If grass was found at the cave when no one had been buried, then it was thought it showed someone had been murdered, and the cave could not be approached until the grass had been dispersed.

Social organisation
The Gunditjmara were divided into 59 clans, each with its headmen (wungit), a role passed on by hereditary transmission. They spoke distinct dialects, not all of them mutually intelligible, with the three main hordes located around Lake Condah, Port Fairy and Woolsthorpe respectively. The Gunditjmara groups are divided into two moieties, respectively the grugidj (sulphur-crested cockatoo or Long-billed corella) and the gabadj  (Red-tailed black cockatoo, the latter once thriving in buloke woodlands, now mainly cleared.

According to Alfred William Howitt, they had four sections, which however did not affect marriage rules:
 kerup   (water)
 boom   (mountain)
 direk   (swamp)
 gilger   (river)

However these terms refer to 4 of the 58 clans.

Descent was matrilineal.

Clans
The following is a list of the Gunditjmara clans (conedeet), taken from that in Ian D. Clark's work.

Economy

The Gunditjmara are traditionally river and lake people, with Framlingham Forest, Lake Condah and the surrounding river systems being of great importance to them economically and spiritually. These include stone races; canals; traps; stone walls; stone house sites  and stone cairns. Some of the groundwork is older than the Egyptian pyramids. A controversy exists concerning the extent to which these features are the results of natural environmental processes or cultural modifications of the landscape by Indigenous people. Peter Coutts and others argued, in a work entitled Aboriginal Engineers of the Western District, Victoria, that numerous features show the handiwork of Aboriginal landscaping for economic purposes. This thesis was challenged as a mythical "romancing of the landscape" by Anne Clarke, one that confused natural processes with socially crafted infrastructure. However, fresh archaeological work by Heather Builth led to her contending that they had a sophisticated system of aquaculture and eel farming. They built stone dams to hold the water in these swampy volcanic areas, especially the area comprising the lava flow of the Budj Bim volcano, creating ponds and wetlands in which they harvested short-finned eels (kuyang or more commonly kooyang).

The Budj Bim National Heritage Landscape, which includes both the Tyrendarra Area and the Mt Eccles – Lake Condah Area, comprising Budj Bim National Park (formerly Mt Eccles National Park), Stones State Faunal Reserve, Muldoons Aboriginal Land, Allambie Aboriginal Land and Condah Mission) was added to the National Heritage List on 20 July 2004, under the Environment Protection and Biodiversity Conservation Act 1999.

Several designated areas comprising the Budj Bim Cultural Landscape were added to the UNESCO World Heritage List in 2019.
In the wake of the burning of some 7,000 hectares of bushland around Lake Condah and in the Budj Bim National Park, further channel structures came to light.

They also created channels linking these wetlands. These channels contained weirs with large woven baskets made by women to cull mature eels. Professor Peter Kershaw, noted palynologist at Monash University, as cited by Bruce Pascoe in his best-selling work Dark Emu, found evidence of a sudden change in vegetation consistent with an artificial ponding system, and initial radiocarbon dating of the soil samples suggests the ponds were created up to 8,000 years ago.

The eels were prepared by smoking them with burning leaves from Australian blackwood. The coastal clans, like other tribes on the south-west coast, according to an early settler, Thomas Browne, had a rich fish diet, which included whale (cunderbul) flesh,

History
In a study published in February 2020, new evidence produced by using a form of radiometric dating known as argon-argon dating, showed that both Budj Bim and Tower Hill volcanoes erupted at least 34,000 years ago. Specifically, Budj Bim was dated at within 3,100 years either side of 36,900 years BP, and Tower Hill was dated at within 3,800 years either side of 36,800 years BP. Significantly, this is a "minimum age constraint for human presence in Victoria", and also could be interpreted as evidence for the Gunditjmara oral histories which tell of volcanic eruptions being some of the oldest oral traditions in existence. An axe found underneath volcanic ash in 1947 was also proof that humans inhabited the region before the eruption of Tower Hill.

The beginnings of contact with ngamadjidj (white people) date as far back as 1810, when whalers and sealers began to use Portland as a base area for their operations. Contact exposed the local people to epidemics from new diseases born by whites but otherwise was seasonal, and allowed time for demographic recovery.

Eumerella Wars

The major turn in relations occurred with the arrival of, and settlement of their lands by, the Henty Brothers from 1834 onwards. Though much silence surrounded the massacres that took place, and, despite Boldrerwood's explicit testimony, some early historians dismissed the idea of a guerilla war.

The Gunditjmara people fought fiercely for their lands during what became known as the Eumerella Wars, which lasted for decades. Women would fight as well, using their digging sticks which had a dual purpose as a weapon, for defence, for settling disputes and for meting out punishments as part of customary law.

Ian D. Clark has identified 28 massacre sites most of the colonialist slaughters taking place during the Eumerella War, so named when the phrase was used as a chapter heading in the memoirs of the novelist Rolf Boldrewood who squatted 50,000 acres near Port Fairy a decade after the main killings.

Sometime in 1833–1834, though the incident has been dated later, to around, 1839, whalers, perhaps 'tonguers,' are thought to have clashed with the Kilcarer Gundidj on the beach at Portland at a site that later became known as Convincing Ground in an incident now known as the Convincing Ground massacre. Various versions exist. The site earned its name either because whalers hashed out their disputes there, because some transaction took place between the indigenous people and whalers, or because disputes arose, either of whale flesh or of the use of native women. If the dispute was over the carcass of a beached whale, the whites may have wished to flense it while the natives may have insisted that it was theirs, as dictated by their ancient customs.

Estimates of the number of people killed in the dispute is unknown, varying from only a few to 30, 60 and as high as 200. All but two of the Kilcarer gundidj clan, Pollikeunnuc and Yarereryarerer, were said to have died. Robinson surmised many had been killed from encounters with 30 members of several different Dhauwurd wurrung clans. A minority view argued by Michael Connors, emerging in the context of Australia's recent History wars argues the figure of 200 dead misinterprets an 1841 report by the Portland Police Magistrate James Blair to Governor Latrobe referring to up to 200 Aboriginals amassing at Convincing Ground, and claims that modern research has fabricated the massacre. His arguments have been analysed, with a negative verdict by Ian D. Clark.

George Augustus Robinson, the official Protector of Aborigines, in travelling in this western area in 1841, reported that settlers in the districts spoke of 'dropping the Aborigines as coolly as if speaking of dropping birds.' The loss of numbers, and headsmen meant clans were forced to unite under other clans and their chieftains. Thus the wungit of the Yiyar clan Boorn Boorn assumed leadership of the Cart gunditj, the Kilgar gunditj and Eurite gunditj when their leadership was eliminated.

Rev Benjamin Hurst (missionary to the Port Phillip tribe) noted in a Weslayen Mission meeting in 1841 that in the Portland bay area "it was usual for some to go out in parties on the Sabbath with guns, for the ostensible purpose of kangarooing, but, in reality to hunt and kill these miserable beings — the bones and the bodies of the slaughtered blacks had been found — but because the evidence of the native was not admissible in a court, the white murderers had escaped with impunity, and were still pursuing their career of crime and blood".

Resisting dispossession, the Gunditjmara concentrated in the Stony Rises from which they waged guerilla warfare against the pastoralists usurping their lands, raiding their flocks and herds. Some protection was also afforded by the native protectorate set up at Mount Rouse, which the tribes used as a basis for their operations. A particular point of ire were settlements that took over sacred sites associated with Mount Napier, Lake Condah and Port Fairy.

Due to the ongoing battles in the 1840s, the Gunditjmara became well known as "The fighting Gunditjmara".

{| class="wikitable"
|+28 massacres in Gunditjmara country 1833/4 to ?
! Date
! Location
! Aborigines involved
! Europeans involved
! Aboriginal deaths reported
|-
| 1833 or 1834
| Convincing Grounds two miles west of the mouth of the Surrey River
| Kilcarer gundidj clan
| Whalers
| from 60 to 200 people, decimating all but 2 tribespeople
|-
| June 1838
| Merino Downs station, Wannon River, near Henty
| unknown Gunditjmara clan
| Joseph Bonsor, shepherd and hutkeeper, who had been waddied
| 1 Gunditmara man
|-
| October 1838
| Merino Downs station, Wannon River, near Henty
| unknown Gunditjmara clan
| William Heath, shepherd, killed
| 1 Gunditmara man, stabbed with sheep shears. Oral version 40.
|-
| October 1838
|  Samuel Winter's station Spring Valley or Murndal, Wannon River, near Merino
| unknown Gunditjmara clan
| William Jefrey speared, while, with Charles Corrigan and, William Elliot, fighting a mob raiding for sheep
| 2 Gunditmara men
|-
| November 1838
| Samuel Winter's station Spring Valley or Murndal
| unknown Gunditjmara clan
| 7 whites set upon and shot an Aboriginal group of 20–30 camping at the Wannon River
| 1 Gunditjmara youth wounded, fate unknown
|-
| February 1840
| Merino Downs station, Wannon River, near Henty
| unknown Gunditjmara clan
| A shepherd named Blood maliciously wounded Woolangwang
| 1 man, Woolangwang, died.
|-
|  Before 17 February 1840
| George Winter's Tahara station on the Wannon River and McLeods Creek, northeast of Merino
| unknown Gunditjmara or Djab wurrung clan
| George Winter and his men, one, Robinson known for his violence. He had dashed out the brains of an Aboriginal child.
| 5 Gunditjmara or Djab wurrung men killed
|-
| February / March 1840
| unknown
| a presumed Gunditjmara man
| A stockman employed by the Henty brothers
| 1 Gunditjmara shot wantonly
|-
|  date unknown
| Clover Flat, junction of junction of Bryan Creek. and the Wannon River, near Casterton. Called 'Murdering Flat'.

| Either Gunditjmara or Jardwadjali.
| Thought to have occurred after one of Francis Henty.'s shepherds was killed.
| No. of victims unknown.
|-
|  Perhaps November 1840
| Wannon River, between the Sandford Bridge and junction with Glenelg River
| Either Gunditjmara or Jardwadjali.
| Connell, an overseer for the Henty brothers, whose stocks of flour were subject to stealing
| 'dozens' reportedly killed by arsenic poisoning.
|-
|  Around 1841
|Picaninny Waterhole, Springbank, Glenelg River, south of Casterton
| Elderly Gunditjmara
| Tom, a shepherd for John Henty, who shot and then bayonetted to death a woman.
| Narrerburnin, a wife of the Pallapnue gundidj headsman Koort Kirrup
|-
| 2 June 1841
| Valley of 'Cor.roit'
| Wanedeet gundidj clan of the Gunditjmara
| 3 shepherds working for W. J. Purbrick shot Aborigines after reportedly offering them damper.
| 'Kitting', 'Marg', and 'Piccaninny Jemmy'
|-
| date unknown
| place unknown, perhaps identical to Murdering Flat (2) above.
| unknown clan of Gunditjmara
| Shepherds working for either Edward Henty at Muntham or Francis Henty at Merino Downs, using poison.
| 7 Gunditjmara: Bokarcarreep, Corroitleek, Joeingjoeingburmin, Loohechurning, Marnderremin, Tolort and Yangolarri
|-
| 3 January 1842
| Eumeralla station
| Unknown Gunditjmara:clan
| James Guthrie, overseer at the Eumeralla station
| I Gunditjmara, shot dead while reportedly wielding a liangle
|-
| February 1842
| Tarrone station, Moyne River, some 12 miles north of Port Fairy
| Yowen gundidj clan
| 40 men formed a vigilante band, after 7 stockmen were faced by a milling mob of Aborigines at the station, and tracked them down to a camp, which they plundered while shooting those who fled.
| 2 or 3.
|-
| 24 February 1842
| The junction of Lubra Creek and the Penshurst–Caramut road, at Caramut station
| Moperer gundidj clan
| 6 settlers attacked and killed 5 members of two families asleep among tea-trees by a stream off Mustons Creek and plundered their goods. 3 of the murderers were put on trial before a jury of mainly squatters in a court presided over by Redmond Barry and though the incident was well documented, were deemed not guilty.
| 4 women, Connyer, Natgoncher (pregnant), Wenigoniber, Wooigouing, and 1 male child
|-
| October 1842
| Tarrone station
| Yowen gundidj clan
| Dr James Kilgour who had established his station on the Yowen lands, mustered 40 men to take revenge for a shepherd's murder, and shot two or three in a camp.. Robertson, an overseer then supplied members of the tribe with flour laced with arsenic.
| 9 killed: three men, three women and three children
|-
| 1842
| Warndaa ssite at Boggy Gully, near Black Swamp, just west of Merrang House, on the Hopkins River south of Hexham
| Moperer gundidj clan
| unknown
| unknown
|-
| 1842
| near Donald McKenzie's station on the Crawford River
| Net net yune gundidj clan
| Donald McKenzie and Frederick Edinge had been killed 15 May 1842 and revenge was taken on an unknown number of Gunditjmara
| Several.
|-
| September 1843
| Headwaters of the Crawford River
| Pallapnue gundidj clan
| Australian native police under HEP Dana in retribution for the killing of Christopher Bassett in August 1843 and the theft of his flock.
| 9 shot dead in two separate incidents.
|-
| October 1843
| 8 miles from Mount Eckersley, on the road between Portland and Kanawalla
| Gunditjmara
| George D Lockhart of Kanawalla station had his dray stolen by attackers. Pursued by HEP Dana and his native police, of whom two wounded.
| 2 Aborigines killed, one wounded
|-
| 25 January 1844
| Mullagh station, nearly 7 miles north of Harrow
| clan unknown
| Thomas Barrett was threatened with a liang by a Gunditjmara who wanted his bag of flour
| 1 aboriginal, Jim, was shot dead
|-
| 20 May 1847
| Euremete and Lyne stations, near Branxholme
| unknown clan of Gunditjmara
| A GW Elms shepherd attacked. Subsequently, a group of settlers clashed with some men believed to be responsible
| 2 dead
|-
| April 1847
| Eumeralla district
| Nillan gundidj clan,
| Native Police Corps
| Tarerer (Jupiter) and Tykoohe (Cocknose)
|-
| 1847
| Mount Eccles,
| Gunjditjmara, clan.unknown
| Settler vigilante group
| An estimated 30 Aborigines, including babies.
|-
| Between August 1843 and 1849
| Castlemaddie or Ettrick pastoral runs
| Gunjditjmara, clan.unknown
| William Learmonth, who had taken up 39,000 acres, and the Jamieson brothers, William and Robert
| 1 Aborigine.
|-
| unknown
| Lake Gorrie, Squattleseamere
| Gunjditjmara, clan.unknown
| A groups of settlers led by Charles Hamilton Macknight who had just acquired 47,228 acres in the district, in retribution for the pillaging by 30 blacks of some stores.
| unknown number
|-
| 1840s?-early 1850s?
| Murderers Flat by Darlots Creek, Lake Condah Mission
| Kerup gundidj clan,
| Unknown white gave the community a large bag of flour laced with arsenic. This is a Kerup clan tradition, though there are numerous difficulties with the version given by Rose Donker.{{efn|The following oral report by Mrs Mary Clarke, a descendant of Portland area Gunditjmara, recounts that an overseer on a station saw one of two groups of travelling natives and asked them if they were hungry: Well, you go and sit down over there in that shed.' And they went there. He said, 'I'll make you something to eat,' and he had a great big boiler. He had a boiler there. It was in the shearing shed that he took them to have this meal..They was finished shearing and they took the Aborigines there to have something to eat. They were weak and hungry, and she said, she said to some of her friends, 'I'm not stopping. I'm gunna go on, I'll gop on and I'll come, we'll come back' – she was with her tribe.. and she said, 'I'll come back next morning.' So they did come back and..The overseer made this porridge and he finished them. He put strychnine in it. They didn't known what he was doing, and they're all sitting around looking hungry, all sitting there little children and all, and he was giving them porridge, serving the porridge out to them, and they all went-flop. He murdered them with the porridge, the strychnine in the porridge. And when my mother-in-law came back with her tribe, she said she find them all dead. Children on the mothers- the babies on the mother's breast and little tiny fellows and them all laying about all scattered around dead... Condah, Bloody Lake, they called it.' }}
| 20 men, women and children
|-
|}

Mission life
From the mid- late 19th century attempts were made to have them move into the Framlingham Aboriginal Station, a mission outside Warrnambool. This was unacceptable, it was located moreover on Girai wurrung land. 827 hectares were set aside for them at Lake Condah, and two decades later, in 1885, this reserve was expanded by a further 692 hectares. The tribe congregated here, until an act was passed to deny right of residence to any "half-caste", resulting in the dispersal of many Gunditjmara kinsfolk, and the loss of their collective traditions, with the Condah mission numbers dropping drastically from 117 to 20.

The land was reclaimed in 1951 by the government and allocated to returnee soldiers.

In 2005 the area began to be bulldozed for groundwork for an eight-lot subdivision. The dispute was settled when the area was set aside as a reservation, in an agreement forged in February 2007.

Native title
In 1987, the Victorian Labor government under John Cain attempted to grant some of the Framlingham State Forest to the trust as inalienable title. However, the legislation was blocked by the Liberal Party opposition in the Victorian Legislative Council. The federal Labor government under Bob Hawke intervened, passing the Aboriginal Land (Lake Condah and Framlingham Forest) Act 1987, which gave  of the Framlingham Forest to the Framlingham Trust. Although the title is essentially inalienable, in that it can only be transferred to another Indigenous land trust, the Framlingham Trust has rights to prevent mining on the land, unlike trusts or communities holding native title.

The Lake Condah Mission lands were also returned to the Gunditjmara on 1 January 1987, when the  former reserve was vested to the Kerrup Jmara Elders Corporation. The transfer included "full management, control and enjoyment by the Kerrup-Jmara Elders Aboriginal Corporation of the land granted to it".

In 1993, the Peek Whurrong members of the Gunditjmara purchased the Deen Maar under the auspices of ATSIC for the Framlingham Aboriginal Trust, with the intention that it become an Indigenous Protected Area (IPA), it was granted this status in 1999. Becoming the first IPA in Victoria.

The Lake Condah Mob launched their Native Title Claim in August 1996.

On 27 July 2011, together with the Eastern Maar people, the Gunditjmara People were recognised to be the native title-holders of the 4,000 hectares of Crown including Lady Julia Percy Island, known to them as Deen Maar.

Gunditj Mirring Traditional Owners Aboriginal Corporation
The Gunditj Mirring Traditional Owners Aboriginal Corporation (GMTOAC) is a Registered Native Title Body Corporate (RNTBC) under the Commonwealth Native Title Act 1993, and a Registered Aboriginal Party under the Victorian Aboriginal Heritage Act 2006. The TOAC owns culturally significant properties across Western Victoria on behalf of the Gunditjmara community.

Notable people

 Geoff Clark, the first and only elected Aboriginal chairman of ATSIC
 Vicki Couzens, Vice Chancellor's Indigenous Research Fellow at RMIT and senior knowledge custodian
 Johnny Cuzens, member of the First XI Aboriginal Cricket Team
 Dakota Davidson, Australian rules footballer
 Alfred Egan, the first indigenous player for Carlton and North Melbourne football clubs
 Isaiah Firebrace, singer who won the eighth season of The X Factor Australia and represented Australia in the Eurovision Song Contest 2017
 Richard Frankland, playwright and musician
 Misty Jenkins, cancer researcher, Laboratory Head of Immunology at WEHI (the Walter and Eliza Hall Institute of Medical Research) at Melbourne University, first Indigenous Australian to attend Oxford and universities as a postdoctoral research fellow
 Chris Johnson, Brisbane Lions AFL player
 Nathan Lovett-Murray, Essendon AFL player
 Andrew Lovett, Essendon and St Kilda AFL player
 Ted Lovett, who was awarded Order of Australia Medal for services to the Indigenous community in south-west Victoria
 Wally Lovett, Richmond and Collingwood AFL player
 Norm McDonald, AFL player
 Archie Roach , musician, 2020 Victorian of the Year, winner of multiple Deadly Awards, ARIA Awards and other awards
 Lionel Rose , first Indigenous Australian of the Year, the first Indigenous World Champion Boxer, the first Indigenous person awarded a Gold Record for Music, first Indigenous recipient of an MBE
 Reg Saunders, first Aboriginal commissioned officer in the Australian Army
 Lidia Thorpe, a Gunai/Gunditjmara woman, first Aboriginal woman elected to the Parliament of Victoria, first Aboriginal Victorian federal MP (Australian Greens)

Alternative names
 Dhauhurtwurru (an ethnonnym from the name for the language)
 Gournditch-mara (['Gunditj] = name of Lake Condah ['mara] = ['ma:r] = man), Gurnditschmara Kirurndit Ku:nditjmara Kuurn-kopan-noot (language name)
 Ngutuk (This was an exonym, meaning 'thou', used by a neighbouring tribe)
 Nil-can-cone-deets Port Fairy tribe. (Used of the horde along that region's coast, which spoke a dialect called Peekwhuurong).
 Spring Creek tribe (This referred the Woolsthorpe Mopor horde)
 Tourahonong Villiers tribe Weeritch-WeeritchSources:  ,

Some words

 kunang (shit)
 malang  (wife)
 merrejig('good'; also used as a greeting)
 ngirang (mother)
 Ngutjung yangi-yangi ngutjung (good, very good).
 paratj(girl)
 pipayi/bebì  (father)
 pundiya (to live)
 tarayl (virgin)
 thatha (to drink)
 thin wurn-ngayi (This is our place)
 thung (smoke)
 tjiparak  (clown)
 walat (frost, ice)
 windha (where?)
 yul-yul (wild man)
 yuwa (to sleep)

See also
 Budj Bim heritage areas

Notes

Citations

Sources

See also attached documents: National Heritage List Location and Boundary Map, and Government Gazette'', 20 July 2004.

Further reading
 

 

Aboriginal peoples of Victoria (Australia)
History of Victoria (Australia)
Western District (Victoria)